Tentaspina feriae is a moth of the family Erebidae first described by Michael Fibiger in 2011. It is found in Indonesia (it was described from northern Sumatra).

The wingspan is 10.5–12 mm. The forewings are light brown, including the terminal area and the fringes. The costa is basally black, just like the quadrangular upper, medial and subterminal areas. There are small black costal dots basally, subbasally and subapically. The crosslines, including the medial shade are brown and waved. The terminal line is only indicated by black interveinal dots. The hindwings are grey with an indistinct discal spot. The underside of the forewings is unicolorous brown and the underside of the hindwings is grey with a discal spot.

References

Micronoctuini
Moths described in 2011
Taxa named by Michael Fibiger